Rashed Muhayer (Arabic:راشد مهير) (born 20 February 1988) is an Emirati footballer who plays as a defender.

External links

References

Emirati footballers
1984 births
Living people
Al Ain FC players
Al-Wasl F.C. players
Al Dhafra FC players
Al Wahda FC players
UAE Pro League players
Association football defenders